Dharmakshetre Kurukshetre is a 1975 Indian Malayalam-language film, directed and produced by Kunchacko. The film stars Prem Nazir, Jayabharathi, Adoor Bhasi and Thikkurissy Sukumaran Nair. The film has musical score by M. S. Viswanathan and Kumarakam Rajappan.

Cast

Prem Nazir
Jayabharathi
Adoor Bhasi
Thikkurissy Sukumaran Nair
Prema
Bahadoor
M. G. Soman
Jayan
Rajakokila
Vincent

Soundtrack
The music was composed by M. S. Viswanathan and Kumarakam Rajappan and the lyrics were written by Vayalar.

References

External links
 

1975 films
1970s Malayalam-language films
Films scored by M. S. Viswanathan